A widespread and deadly tornado outbreak affected the Great Plains, Mississippi Valley, and Southeast between March 12–15, 1953. At least 23 tornadoes were confirmed with the strongest one reaching F4 intensity and striking O'Brien, Texas on Friday the 13th. Overall, 21 people were killed, 72 others were injured, and damages were estimated at $6.835 million (1953 USD). There were additional casualties from non-tornadic events as well.

Meteorological synopsis
Unusually warm weather surged into the Eastern United States on March 12. A jet stream dip, as well as the presence of a southeastward-moving surface low pressure system that had formed over Montana on March 12 led to creation of widespread strong to severe thunderstorms throughout the region along an unusual eastward moving warm front and dryline on March 13. Starting in Central Plains, this area of severe and tornadic thunderstorms pushed eastward, producing damaging winds, large hail, and tornadoes to a total of 16 states before the low, which had turned northeastward, moved into Wisconsin and was replaced by a surface anti-cyclone on March 15.

Confirmed tornadoes

March 12 event

March 13 event

March 14 event

March 15 event

Jud–O'Brien–Southeastern Knox City, Texas

This violent F4 tornado first touched down in Jud and almost immediately became violent. Five people died when their home in the town was obliterated. The tornado then swept northeast, passing west of Rochester, where four more people were killed in another destroyed home. The tornado then continued through open terrain before moving directly through O'Brien, causing catastrophic damage and three more fatalities. Throughout Haskell County, the tornado killed 12, injured 20, and caused $2.5 million in damage.

The tornado then moved into Knox County, where some of the most intense damage occurred. It struck several neighborhoods in Southeastern Knox City, which sustained almost total destruction. Many homes were swept away along an eight block stretch through the city and in rural areas nearby while many others were destroyed or damaged. In all, 139 homes in Knox City were damaged or destroyed, killing five and injuring another five. As the tornado moved out the east side of town, it quickly weakened and ultimately dissipated shortly thereafter. Along with the casualties, there was $2.5 million in damage in Knox County.

Along its path, the tornado destroyed 33 homes, damaged 139 others, and destroyed 43 other buildings. A total of 17 people were killed and 25 (possibly 60) others were injured, all severely.

Allison–Melbourne–LaCrosse–Myron, Arkansas

Around the same time the F3 tornado touched down well to its southwest, this second long-tracked, strong F2 tornado touched down west of Mountain View just southeast of the joint towns of Newnata and Big Springs, which sustained some damage. It moved northeast, striking the joint rural community of Allison and Sylamore along the White River and inflicting moderate damage. The tornado then continued northeast over the Brandenburg Mountain, just missing Lone Star before moving directly through Melbourne, where moderate to severe damage was inflicted to multiple structures and homes. It then moved out of Melbourne and hit the northwest side of Lacrosse, where more damage was observed. The tornado then moved back into rural areas of Izard County and reached its peak intensity as it passed southeast of Franklin and into Myron. It caused severe damage and destroyed multiple structures before it abruptly weakened and dissipated as it was approaching Ash Flat from the southwest.

A total of 22 homes were extensively damaged or destroyed and three barns were destroyed as well. Similar to the previous tornado however, there were no casualties from this early-morning tornado.

Bailey–Northern Wilson–Macclesfield–Crisp, North Carolina

This narrow but long-tracked, intense F3 tornado touched down southeast of Bailey in Nash County and moved southeast, damaging five homes and 10 other buildings with seven families being affected. As it moved into Wilson County west-southwest of Sims, it turned east and strengthened as it moved towards the northern side of Wilson. It then struck several neighborhoods there, causing heavy damage, especially on east side of the area where it reached its peak strength. A total of 16 homes were severely damaged, a school sustained so much damage ($30,000) that it was forced to close, one person was injured and 16 families were impacted. Local officials stated that it was the worst storm to hit the area since 1929. Moving east, the tornado exited Wilson into rural areas of Wilson County damaging mostly farmlands. It then moved through the rural community of Wilbanks, damaging the homes in the area. The tornado then began to weaken as it moved into Edgecombe County and directly into Macclesfield, causing severe damage. The tornado then moved into Crisp, causing some additional damage before dissipating east of town. Damage along this final portion included the destruction of a home and another building with damage being inflicted to three other homes and four families were affected as well.

It caused no fatalities, but did injure one person. Grazulis classified this tornado as an F2.

Non-tornadic impacts
On March 12, small, but abundant  hail caused heavy damage to planes at the Little Rock Municipal Airport while also damaging a commercial greenhouse. The next day, Oklahoma was pelted by numerous severe thunderstorms that produced considerable hail and wind damage across mainly the southern and eastern portions of the state. In Elmer many roofs and windows were damaged, a barn was blown down, and the roof of an abandoned school was blown off. Even worst damage occurred in Lawton, where high winds and  hail damaged every roof, broke many windows, and dented many vehicles in town while nearby Fort Sill saw extensive damage to airplanes and buildings. Losses in the area alone was estimated at $2 million (1953 USD). The town of Red Oak also suffered heavy wind damage while multiple roads and bridges in the area were washed out by heavy rainfall as well. On the cold side of the system, heavy snow caused a man to die of exposure after he got lost near Esterbrook, Wyoming.

The severe weather outbreak in Oklahoma continued into the early-morning hours of March 14 with lightning striking and damaging church in Tulsa. By that time, the outbreak had begun to shift into Arkansas with severe thunderstorms inflicting hail damage to numerous areas Van Buren County. That afternoon, more hail damage was inflicted to roofs and neon signs in Harrisburg. Widespread hail and wind damage also occurred across Illinois and Missouri while a tenant home in the Lepanto-Rivervale, Arkansas area was destroyed by strong winds. That night, a thundersquall caused some wind damage in Jefferson Parish, Louisiana while a barn with stored grain in Boone Township, Indiana was destroyed by high winds as well, although a tornado may have been involved. On the south side of Wayne, Arkansas, a severe storm also caused wind damage to a drive-in theatre and hail damage to several car.

Early on March 15, a lightning strike sparked a fire that destroyed a barn and stored crops and killed livestock near Granville, Ohio. That night in Fort Meade, Maryland, lightning struck a home, damaging two rooms, with the family of four inside being treated for shock. Later, another severe storm in Hopewell, Virginia partially ripped the roof off of a radio station, buckled rafters at a partially constructed church, which also saw its basement roof crack open, damaged nearly 100 homes damaged, caused minor power failures, and uprooted trees. Farther north, a glaze of ice due to freezing rain disrupted 63 long-distance phone circuits in North-Central Wisconsin.

See also
 List of North American tornadoes and tornado outbreaks
 2011 Super Outbreak
 Tornado outbreak of April 27–30, 2014

Notes

References

Tornadoes of 1953
F4 tornadoes by date
Tornadoes in the United States
Tornadoes in Texas
Tornadoes in Oklahoma
Tornadoes in Arkansas
Tornadoes in Mississippi
Tornadoes in Missouri
Tornadoes in Tennessee
Tornadoes in Illinois
Tornadoes in Indiana
Tornadoes in North Carolina
Tornado 1953-03
Tornado 1953-03
Tornado 1953-03